Justin Time may refer to:
 Justin Time Records, a Canadian independent record label established in 1983
 Justin Time (film), a 2010 American direct-to-video film
 Justin Time (TV series), a 2011 Canadian animated television series

See also
 Just in Time (disambiguation)